"Just Got Lucky" was the second single from the British band JoBoxers. The track was initially released on the band's debut album, Like Gangbusters, in 1983. The song reached the top ten in the UK and the top 40 in the United States that autumn. It was later released on the band's albums Doing the Boxerbeat - The Anthology and Essential Boxerbeat.

Chart history

In popular culture
In December 2008, the song was used in a radio advert, for a Max's Restaurant promotion "Lucky with the Tilaok".
It was included in the compilation album Chorus Girl and the films The 40-Year-Old Virgin,<ref></ref> Just My Luck, Philippine film Bagets, and Lucky 13. The song was also used in the final weekly of Pinoy Big Brother: Teen Edition 4.
In November 12, 2017, the song was performed by the cast of Goin' Bulilit at the opening of the 1980s episode.
In November 14, 2020, the song was performed on an Eat Bulaga!'' segment "Social Dis-dancing" for a dance challenge

References

External links
 Lyrics of this song
Soundtrack to The 40 Year Old Virgin
Just Got Lucky on VH1.com (via Wayback Machine)
Just Got Lucky on the Official JoBoxers Website
 

1983 songs
1983 singles
JoBoxers songs
RCA Records singles